The Only Way Is Up may refer to:

"The Only Way Is Up", a 1988 hit dance song performed by Yazz and the Plastic Population
The Only Way Is Up (EP), a 2000 extended play by The Drugs
"The Only Way Is Up" (Martin Garrix and Tiësto song), 2015